In field lacrosse, the goaltender (goalie, goalkeeper, or the keeper) is the most important and last line of defense between the opposing offense and the goal. The goaltender's primary roles are to defend the opposing team's shots on goal and to direct the defense.

Rules 
Goaltenders are the only ones on the field who can touch the ball with their hands. However, they are not allowed to pick up or control the ball with their hands. Hand touches are legal only when in the crease. Each team has a goaltender on the field at all times. If the goaltender stops a shot by the opposing team, or picks the ball up any other way, the goaltender has 4 seconds in the crease to pass the ball or run with the ball. If the goaltender fails to do so, the ball will be awarded to the opposing team. After those 4 seconds, the goaltender must leave the crease. After the goaltender leaves the crease, they are given 20 seconds to "clear" the ball past the half of the field; if the goaltender fails to do so, the ball will be awarded to the opposing team.

Equipment
A goaltender is required to wear certain protective gear. Every goaltender must wear gloves, a chest protector, a helmet, a throat guard, a mouth guard, and a protective cup. They optionally wear a padded girdle covering the waist to the thigh and elbow pads. Goaltenders' lacrosse stick can vary between the length of the short and long sticks of field players depending on age and preference. The head of the goalie's stick can be up to 12 inches at its widest point.

Role
The goaltender's role is to prevent the ball from going into the goal. Primarily, goalies use their stick to block shots. However, many saves are off the goalie's body or helmet.

Penalties
The goaltender is treated like a field player for all technical and personal fouls. In addition, upon controlling the ball in his stick within the crease, the goalie has four seconds to either pass or run the ball outside of the crease. No player may carry the ball into the crease, but a goalie in the crease can receive a pass, at which point a four-second count begins. Outside the crease, the goaltender has no special protections, and may bring the ball into the offensive zone and even score.

Notable field lacrosse goaltenders

 Jim Beardmore
 Trevor Tierney
 Jesse Schwartzman
 Greg Cattrano
 Brian Dougherty
 Chris Garrity
 CJ Kemp
 Quint Kessenich
 Sal LoCascio
 Daniel R. Mackesey
 Tillman Johnson
 Doc Schneider
 Drew Adams
 Chris Sanderson
 Brett Queener
 John Galloway 
 Scott Rodgers
 Jack Kelly
 Blaze Riorden
 Jd Colarusso
 Adam Ghitelman
 Dillion Ward
 Jack Starr
 Mike Adler
 Colby Kneese
 Turner Uppgreen
 Jacob Stover
 Chayse Ierlan
 Scott Bacigalupo
 Larry Quinn
 Cookie Krongard

Records
Brett Queener holds the NCAA record for most goals scored by a goaltender with 5 career goals. Greg Cattrano and Brian Dougherty hold the record as three time Major League Lacrosse Goaltender of the Year Award winners. Cattrano is the only goaltender to have won the Major League Lacrosse MVP Award.

See also
 Goaltender (box lacrosse)
 Ensign C. Markland Kelly, Jr. Award presented annually to the top goaltender in NCAA
 Major League Lacrosse Goaltender of the Year Award presented annually to the top goaltender in the MLL
 Tewaaraton Award

External links
 NCAA Men's Lacrosse 2017 and 2018 Rules

References

Goalkeeping
Lacrosse terminology